
Koło County is a unit of territorial administration and local government (powiat) in Greater Poland Voivodeship, west-central Poland. It came into being on January 1, 1999, as a result of the Polish local government reforms passed in 1998.

As of 2010 its total population is 88,244, out of which the population of Koło is 23,034, that of Kłodawa is 6,829, that of Dąbie is 2,087, that of Przedecz is 1,771, and the rural population is 54,880.

History
Unit formed in Kalisz Governorate in 1867, since 1918 in the Second Polish Republic,  German Landkreis Warthbrücken during World War II, later in Polish People's Republic, dissolved in 1975, reconstructed in 1998.

Neighbouring counties
Koło County is bordered by Radziejów County and Włocławek County to the north, Kutno County and Łęczyca County to the east, Poddębice County to the south-east, Turek County to the south, and Konin County to the west.

Administrative division
The county is subdivided into 11 gminas (one urban, three urban-rural and seven rural). These are listed in the following table, in descending order of population.

References
 Polish official population figures 2006

 
Land counties of Greater Poland Voivodeship